The Corn Bowl was a college football bowl game played from 1947 until 1955 in central Illinois. There was no game played in 1952 and 1954.

The game was primarily organized by A. B. Perry, who called for the construction of a stadium that would seat 150,000.  The plans never came to fruition and the largest crowd attracted to a game was 8,000 spectators for the 1948 matchup.  The 1949 matchup was witnessed by 4,567 fans.

The bowl was sponsored by the Hybrid Seed Corn Breeders of Illinois and the Bloomington American Legion.

Results

References

Defunct college football bowls
Sports in Bloomington–Normal
American football in Illinois
Recurring sporting events established in 1947
Recurring events disestablished in 1955
1947 establishments in Illinois
1955 disestablishments in Illinois